The Rajiv Gandhi Charitable Trust (RGCT) is a registered non-profit institution which was established in 2002 by the Indian National Congress. Named after the 6th Prime Minister of India, the trust is headed by the Interim President of the Indian National Congress.

Board of Trustees and Management 
The Board of Trustees as well as the Management of the Rajiv Gandhi Charitable is heavily influenced by the Indian National Congress.

Board of Trustees

Management

Initiatives

Rajiv Gandhi Mahila Vikas Pariyojana 
Rajiv Gandhi Mahila Vikas Pariyojana (RGMVP) is a flagship program of the Rajiv Gandhi Charitable Trust (RGCT) which "aims to build and strengthen the community institutions of the poor". It is a rights-based initiative that works for poverty reduction, women’s empowerment and rural development in the backward regions of Uttar Pradesh. The main activity of RGMVP includes organising poor rural women into community institutions in the form of Self Help Groups (SHGs) - each consisting of 10-20 women - that act as social platforms to address issues of financial inclusion, healthcare, livelihood, education and environment. The organisation has "the belief that the poor have a strong desire and innate ability to overcome poverty".

RGMVP has been designed by RGCT and National Bank for Agriculture and Rural Development (NABARD) with technical assistance from the Society for Elimination of Rural Poverty (SERP) for promotion, credit linkage and federation of SHGs in select districts of Uttar Pradesh. The programme has been visited by the Microsoft Chairman, Bill Gates and the British ex-Foreign Secretary, David Miliband.

Indira Gandhi Eye Hospital and Research Centre 
Indira Gandhi Eye Hospital and Research Centre (IGEHRC) was established by the Trust (RGCT) in 2006 to address a requirement for quality and affordable eye care and eliminate curable blindness in Northern India and Asia. Currently, two hospitals are operating in Uttar Pradesh: a secondary level facility in Amethi, and a tertiary level hospital in Lucknow. Two additional centres are operational in Gurugram. IGEHRC aims "to provide timely and affordable world-class eye care to all segments of society". Regular community outreach programmes are organised in rural areas to provide quality eye care and to create eye care awareness among the rural population.

Controversies

Amethi Rajiv Gandhi Trust land grab scam 
In 1983 Uttar Pradesh State Industrial Development Corporation had taken 65 acres land from farmers to set up a factory by Emperor Bicycle Company in Kauhar village of Amethi. After company failed to set up the factory, instead of returning the land to farmers as per rule, it was given to the Rajiv Gandhi Charitable Trust in violation of rules. The trust was sued. On 26 August 2015, the local court ordered the Rajiv Gandhi Trust to return the land to Uttar Pradesh State Industrial Development Corporation. But despite the order, the land is continued to be under the trust.

Gurugram Rajiv Gandhi Trust land grab scam 
Between 2004-2014, Government of Haryana, then under the administration of Indian National Congress's Chief Minister Bhupinder Singh Hooda, had handed over 1,400 acres of panchayat land to the Rajiv Gandhi Charitable Trust in the name of public interest use, resulting in this trust being sued by the gram panchayat in Punjab and Haryana High Court against the land grabbing of the Gandhi family by the Hooda government.

Investigations

Probe by Home Ministry 
In 2018, Ministry of Home Affairs launched a probe to investigate violation of foreign funding laws in 42 organizations one of which was the Rajiv Gandhi Charitable Trust.

Inter-Ministerial Committee 
In 2020, Ministry of Home Affairs set up a inter-ministerial committee headed by the special director of the Enforcement Department to coordinate investigation into violation of various legal provisions of PMLA, Income Tax Act, FCRA and other provisions by the Rajiv Gandhi Charitable Trust along with the Rajiv Gandhi Foundation and the Indira Gandhi Memorial Trust. The committee will consist of the representatives from the Ministry of Home Affairs, Enforcement Directorate, Central Bureau of Investigation and Income Tax Department.

See also 
 National Herald scam

References

External links 
 RGCT- Official Website
 RGMVP- Official Website
 IGEHRC- Official Website
 Rajiv Gandhi Foundation - a sister organisation
 A note on RGMVP by Shoaib Sultan Khan
 A case study on RGMVP by the Livelihood School

Organizations established in 2002
Charities based in India
2002 establishments in Delhi
Nehru–Gandhi family
Charitable trusts